Prison Interior (Spanish: Interior de cárcel) is an oil on canvas painting completed by the Spanish artist Francisco Goya (1746–1828) between 1793-94. The painting is bathed in a dim, cold light which gives it a look feeling of purgatory. 

It is one of a number of works the artist made of scenes set in lunatic asylums, including Yard with Lunatics (1793–1794) and The Madhouse (1812-1813). These works were painted at a time when mad-houses were 'holes in the social surface, small dumps into which the psychotic could be thrown without the smallest attempt to discover, classify,  or treat the nature of their illness." Goya often feared for his own sanity, a fact which underscores these works with feelings of dread.

See also
List of works by Francisco Goya

Notes

Bibliography
 Connell, Evan S. Francisco Goya: A Life. New York: Counterpoint, 2004. 
 Hughes, Robert. Goya. New York: Alfred A. Knopf, 2004.

External links

1793 paintings
1794 paintings
Paintings by Francisco Goya
Paintings in North East England